Rannebergens IF is a Swedish football club located in Angered.

Background
Rannebergens IF currently plays in Division 4 Göteborg A which is the sixth tier of Swedish football. They play their home matches at the Gunnaredsplan in Angered.

The club is affiliated to Göteborgs Fotbollförbund.

Season to season

Footnotes

External links
 Rannebergens IF – Official website
 Rannebergens IF on Facebook

Football clubs in Gothenburg
1973 establishments in Sweden
Football clubs in Västra Götaland County